A dominant position may refer to:
 Dominant position in grappling
 Dominant male sex position
 Dominant female sex position
 Dominance (economics), the firm's dominant position in the market